Love & Hate is the third album released by Bachata group Aventura released on November 18, 2003, by Premiun Latin Music. The album's production is based on bachata with elements of Hip Hop and R&B, similar to the bands previous studio albums. It is considered the band's album with the most songs that contains social messages including "La Hermanita" and "Papi Dijo". The album was supported by two official singles, "Hermanita" and "Llorar", song about domestic violence in which the male voice talks to his little sister about her abusive relationship and his sadness.

Sales figure were lower in comparison of their previous album We Broke The Rules. However, The album success helped to consolidate the band's position on the mainstream and Latin music industry. The album peaked at the Top 5 at US Billboard Tropical Albums and charted insade of Spain, Italy and France albums charts. It was certified platinum (Latin field) by RIAA in the United States and Switzerland. Love & Hate was nominated for Album of the Year at Premios Lo Nuestro 2005. Eventually, the band won Tropical Duo or Group of the year at the same ceremony.

Track listing 

The original version of the album, "Don't Waste My Time" is a hidden track inside the song "La Guerra (The War)".

Chart performance

Weekly charts

Year-end charts

Sales and certifications

References

External links
Aventura official site

2003 albums
Aventura (band) albums